Portrait of Francesco Gonzaga (c. 1461) is a painting by Italian  Renaissance artist Andrea Mantegna. It is now at the National Museum of Capodimonte, Naples, Italy.

Francesco Gonzaga was the second son of Ludovico Gonzaga, Marquess of Mantua, who had been appointed as cardinal by Pope Pius II aged seventeen, just after the Council of Mantua.

The painting is one of the first portraits executed by Mantegna at the Mantuan court, where he had moved in 1460.

See also
Portrait of Federico II Gonzaga

Sources

External links
Page at museum's official website 

Paintings by Andrea Mantegna
1461 paintings
Gonzaga, Francesco
Gonzaga art collection
Paintings in the collection of the Museo di Capodimonte